Oakford (originally called Fairfield) is an unincorporated community in southwestern Taylor Township, Howard County, Indiana, United States.

Oakford is part of the Kokomo, Indiana Metropolitan Statistical Area.

History
Oakford was laid out in 1852. It was originally called Fairfield, and the name Oakford was adopted in 1854.

Geography
Oakford lies at a railroad crossing of State Road 26, and little more than 1 mile (about 2 km) east of State Road 26's intersection with U.S. Route 31 until November 2013. Now US 31 has been moved over, and Oakford is right at the State Road 26 exit (on the west side) on the new interstate grade Highway US 31.

References

Unincorporated communities in Howard County, Indiana
Unincorporated communities in Indiana
Kokomo, Indiana metropolitan area